John White was an Irish politician. A farmer and produce merchant, he was first elected to Dáil Éireann at the 1923 general election as a Farmers' Party Teachta Dála (TD) for the Donegal constituency. He was re-elected at the June 1927 and September 1927 general elections. At the 1932 general election, White was elected as a Cumann na nGaedheal TD. He did not contest the 1933 general election.

References

Year of birth missing
Year of death missing
Farmers' Party (Ireland) TDs
Cumann na nGaedheal TDs
Members of the 4th Dáil
Members of the 5th Dáil
Members of the 6th Dáil
Members of the 7th Dáil
Politicians from County Donegal
Irish farmers